The Circuito Cittadino di Cagliari was a temporary street circuit that encircled the Stadio Sant'Elia football stadium in Cagliari, Italy. The circuit was inaugurated on 10 November 2002. On that weekend the circuit hosted the final race of Euro Formula 3000. After this, the circuit hosted the race the year after, 2003.

Lap records

The official race lap records at the Circuito di Cagliari are listed as:

References 

Sports venues in Italy
Defunct motorsport venues in Italy
2002 establishments in Italy
2003 disestablishments in Italy